The Battle of Vaught's Hill, also known as the Battle of Milton, was a battle of the American Civil War, occurring on March 20, 1863, in Rutherford County, Tennessee.

During the inactivity following the Battle of Stones River, a Union brigade-sized reconnaissance force, under Col. Albert S. Hall, left Murfreesboro on March 18. Circling to the northeast, Hall encountered Confederate Brig. Gen. John Hunt Morgan's cavalry command, which caused him to fall back to a position east of Milton. Pursuing Hall, Morgan's men caught up with him on the morning of March 20, at Vaught's Hill. Dismounted, Morgan struck at both Union flanks, even to the point of encircling Hall's hilltop position. Hall conducted a perimeter defense and withstood all Confederate attacks, which lasted till after 2:00 p.m. Morgan continued to bombard the Union force until 4:30 p.m., when he broke off the engagement, after learning that Union reinforcements were en route from Murfreesboro. Union forces continued to strengthen their position in Middle Tennessee.

Notes

References
 National Park Service battle description
 CWSAC Report Update

Battles of the Middle Tennessee Operations of the American Civil War
Battles of the Western Theater of the American Civil War
Union victories of the American Civil War
Battles of the American Civil War in Tennessee
Rutherford County, Tennessee
Conflicts in 1863
1863 in Tennessee
March 1863 events